Duplex is an electronic music duo based out of Rotterdam.  After several 12 inch singles, remixes and EPs released on labels such as Clone Records, Dub Recordings and Groundzero, Duplex issued their debut album Late Night Driving in 2006 on Clone.  Their sound combines elements of techno and deep house.
Much of their back catalog was recently made available to purchase online via Warp Records' Bleep.com music store.

Discography

EPs
 EP 1 (10") 		Djak-Up-Bitch (DUB) 	1997
 EP 2 (12") 		Djak-Up-Bitch (DUB) 	1997
 EP 3 (12") 		Clone 	2000
 EP 4 (12") 		Clone 	2000
 Autosave (12") 		Ground Zero 	2001
 EP 5 (12") 		Clone 	2001
 Autoload EP (12") 		Clone 	2002
 Rebuild (12") 		Clone 	2002
 Rebuild Part 2 (12") 		Clone 	2002
 Overdue EP (12") 		Klakson 	2003
 Fictional Frequency (12") 		Frantic Flowers 	2005
 P.O.M. Remixed (12") 		Clone 	2005
 Autosug EP (12") 		Clone 	2006
 Autosample EP (12") 		Frantic Flowers 	2007

Albums
 2005 Late Night Driving
 Late Night Driving (2xLP) 		Clone 	2006
 Late Night Driving (CD) 		Clone 	2006

Remixes
 My Dance (Duplex Reshaper) 	Tsunami 	2001
 Mauler (12") 	PGM 400 (Duplex Mix) 	Keynote 	2002
 Punk (CD, Maxi) 	Punk (Duplex Remix) 	Zeitgeist 	2002
 Ultraism EP (12", EP) 	Musical Intrigue (Dupl... 	Digital Soul 	2002
 Love Bubble (12") 	In For Deep (Duplex Re... 	Fortek 	2004
 Oblivion (Duplex Remix) 	AW-Recordings 	2006
 Gyal Flex / Left Then Up (12") 	Left Then Up (Duplex Mix) 	Seventh Sign Recordings 	2007

External links
Official website

Dutch electronic music groups
Remixers